Two ships of the Royal Navy have borne the name HMS Inverness:

 was previously the French privateer Duc de Chartres captured in 1746. She was broken up in 1750
 was a  launched in 1990 and sold to the Estonian Navy in 2006 who renamed her EML Sakala

References

Royal Navy ship names